"Good Friend and a Glass of Wine" is a song written by Darrell Brown, Blair Daly, and co-written and recorded by American country music artist LeAnn Rimes. It was released in March 2008 as the second single from her twelfth studio album, Family. A music video was also released for the single. The single peaked at 35 on the Hot Country Songs charts.

Composition

"Good Friend and a Glass of Wine" is a country pop song of three minutes and 44 seconds. The song is co-written by Rimes along with Darrell Brown and Blair Daly. The song was written in the key of A Major with Rimes' vocal spanning two octaves, from G3 to E5. The song talks about how the subject just needs a break to "talk trash", and have a good time with friends and a glass of wine.

Music video
The music video was released on February 27, 2008. The video was directed by Phil Griffin. The video shows Rimes walking through a town and on the radio singing, with friends and out having a good time.

Track listing
US  [Radio Mixes EP] November 18, 2008
1 What I Cannot Change Kaskade Radio Mix] 3:41
2 What I Cannot Change [Jody Den Broeder Radio Mix] 4:43
3 What I Cannot Change [Scotty K Radio Mix] 4:19
4 What I Cannot Change [Bronleewe & Bose Radio Mix] 4:01
5 Good Friend And A Glass Of Wine [Wideboys Electro Radio Mix] 3:33
6 Good Friend And A Glass Of Wine [Soul Seekerz Radio Mix] 3:32
7 Headphones [Almighty Radio Mix] 3:37

US  [Extended Mixes EP] November 18, 2008
1 What I Cannot Change Kaskade Extended Mix] 5:08
2 What I Cannot Change [Jody den Broeder Extended Mix] 8:03
3 What I Cannot Change [Scotty K Klub Mix] 8:12
4 What I Cannot Change [Bronleewe & Bose Extended Mix] 6:25
5 Good Friend And A Glass Of Wine [Wideboys Electro Mix] 5:49
6 Good Friend And A Glass Of Wine [Soul Seekerz Extended Mix] 8:54
7 Headphones [Almighty Extended Mix] 8:01

Chart performance

References

External links 

 at Billboard.com
"Good Friend and a Glass of Wine" music video at YouTube.com

2008 singles
2007 songs
LeAnn Rimes songs
Song recordings produced by Dann Huff
Songs written by Darrell Brown (musician)
Songs written by Blair Daly
Curb Records singles
Songs written by LeAnn Rimes